Silopi is a city and seat of Silopi District in the Şırnak Province of Turkey. The city is mainly populated by Kurds of Sipêrtî and Zewkan tribes and had a population of 103,831 in 2021.

The mayor Adalet Fidan of the HDP was elected in 2019 but deposed the same year and replaced by the sub-governor (kaymakam) Sezer Işiktaş as a "state-appointed caretaker" (acting mayor).

Large sections of the city was damaged in 2016 during clashes between Turkish forces and PKK.

Neighborhoods 
The city is divided into the eleven neighborhoods of Barbaros, Başak, Cudi, Cumhuriyet, Dicle, Karşıyaka, Nuh, Ofis, Şehit Harun Boy, Yenişehir and Yeşiltepe.

History

Recent history 
Turkish authorities placed the city of Silopi under curfew from 14 December 2015 – 4 January 2016. According to the Peoples' Democratic Party (Turkey), 20 people were killed. Since July 2015, 34 people have been killed in Silopi. On August 7, 2015, clashes between Turkish security forces and the Kurdish militant PKK group may have killed three people. Government reports claimed "terrorists" were killed, while pro-Kurdish Peoples' Democratic Party lawmaker Faysal Sarıyıldız said that the casualties were civilians and that he had seen no sign of armed militants, according to Reuters. The Kurdish-Turkish conflict in the region has escalated since late July 2015.

Employment

Şırnak Silopi power station is powered by asphaltite coal and is claimed both to emit air pollution and to be an important source of employment. In 2020 the EBRD proposed a just transition to support workers who may lose jobs due to the decline of coal in Turkey.

Peanuts are grown.

See also
 Mount Judi
 Şırnak death well trials

References

External links
 Governorship of Şırnak
 Şırnak local newspaper

Populated places in Şırnak Province
Kurdish settlements in Şırnak Province